The following highways are numbered 146A:

United States
Maryland Route 146A
 Massachusetts Route 146A
 New York State Route 146A
 Rhode Island Route 146A

See also
List of highways numbered 146